Nagarame Nanni is a 1967 Malayalam language film, written by M. T. Vasudevan Nair and directed by A. Vincent. The film stars Prem Nazir, Usha Nandhini, Madhu and K. P. Ummer among others. The film tells the story of a family that migrates from a village to the city of Madras in search of a better life. The theme was about the lure of the city and how the dreams of villagers are shattered by its inexorable logic of greed. The plot is similar to the 1965 film The Conquerors of the Golden City, directed by Getin Gurtop and the 1964 film Birds of Exile (Gurbet Kuslari in Turkish) by Halit Refig. K. Balachander's Tamil film Pattina Pravesham (1977) was based on all these three films.

Film expert B. Vijayakumar of The Hindu described the film as "one of the best social movies produced in Malayalam."

Cast
 Prem Nazir as Madhavankutty
 Ushanandini as Bharathi
 Madhu as Raghavan
 P. J. Antony as Anandan Pillai
 K. P. Ummer as Captain Das
 Sukumari as Mrs. Mudaliar
 Bharathi Menon as Madhavankutty's mother
 Jyothi Lakshmi as Kunhilakshmi, Madhavankutty's sister
 Adoor Bhasi
 Nilambur Balan
 Dhaamu
 Pariyanampatta Kunjunni Namboothirippad
 Nambiar
 Venu
 Kuttan Pilla
 Edasseri
 Maniyan
 Shankar Menon
 Solaman
 Prabhakaran
 Santha Devi

Soundtrack 
There are four songs including the romantic hit "Manjani Poonilavu" (sung by S. Janaki), a dance number "Mullappoo Maala Vilkum" (sung by L. R. Easwari) and another hit number "Nagaram Nagaram Mahasagaram" (sung by K. J. Yesudas).

Box office 
The film became a commercial success.

References

1967 films
1960s Malayalam-language films
Films directed by A. Vincent